Érsekhalma (Croatian: Loma) is a  village in Bács-Kiskun county, in the Southern Great Plain region of Hungary.

Geography

Partnership
  Gheorghieni, Romania
  Šupljak, Serbia
  Veľká Ida, Slovakia
  Zwolle, Netherlands

Populated places in Bács-Kiskun County